Romanian verbs are highly inflected in comparison to English, but markedly simple in comparison to Latin, from which Romanian has inherited its verbal conjugation system (through Vulgar Latin). Unlike its nouns, Romanian verbs behave in a similar way to those of other Romance languages such as French, Spanish, and Italian. They conjugate according to mood, tense, voice, person and number. Aspect is not an independent feature in Romanian verbs, although it does manifest itself clearly in the contrast between the imperfect and the compound perfect tenses as well as within the presumptive mood. Also, gender is not distinct except in the past participle tense, in which the verb behaves like an adjective.

Verb paradigm

There are nine moods into which a verb can be put, with five of them being personal (having a different form for each person) and four non-personal. As an example, the tables below show the verb a face ("to do") at all moods, tenses, persons and numbers. Only positive forms in the active voice are given. The corresponding personal pronouns are not included; unlike English verbs, Romanian verbs generally have different forms for each person and number, so pronouns are most often dropped except for emphasis. The English equivalents in the tables (one for each mood and tense) are only an approximative indication of the meaning.

Usage

Simple perfect

The simple perfect has been replaced by the compound perfect in most of the Romanian varieties; it is commonly used in the Oltenian vernacular (graiul oltenesc) to denote recent actions that still affect the present situation: mâncai (I have just eaten). In the literary standard, the simple perfect is used almost exclusively in writing, where the author refers to the characters' actions as they take place. For that reason, the second person is practically never used, whereas the first person appears only when the writer includes himself among the characters.

Imperfect

In Romanian, the compound perfect is often used where other Romance languages would use the imperfect. For example, the English sentence My father was Romanian requires the imperfect when translated into languages like French and Italian, whereas in this context in Romanian the compound perfect form Tatăl meu a fost român is frequently used instead of the imperfect Tatăl meu era român.

Past participle

Verbs in the past participle are used in their singular masculine form when they are part of compound tenses (compound perfect, future perfect, past subjunctive, etc.) in the active voice. As part of a verb in the passive voice, the past participle behaves like adjectives, and thus must agree in number and gender with the subject:

 Active voice: Am făcut curat în casă. (I cleaned the house.)
 Passive voice: Echipa adversă a fost făcută praf. (The opposing team was laid to waste.)

Conjugation groups

From an etymological point of view, Romanian verbs are categorized into four large conjugation groups depending on the ending in the infinitive mood, and this is the verb classification that is currently taught in schools.

Most verbs fall in the first conjugation group with another large number ending in –i (fourth group).

This classification only partially helps in identifying the correct conjugation pattern. Each group is further split into smaller classes depending on the actual morphological processes that occur. For example, a cânta (to sing) and a lucra (to work) both belong to the first conjugation group, but their indicative first person singular forms are eu cânt (I sing) and eu lucrez (I work), which shows different conjugation mechanisms.

A more appropriate classification, which provides useful information on the actual conjugation pattern, groups all regular verbs into 11 conjugation classes, as shown below.

Nevertheless, even such a classification does not consider all possible sound alternances. A full classification, considering all combinations of sound changes and ending patterns, contains about seventy types, not including irregular verbs.

Irregular verbs
There are various kinds of irregularity, such as multiple radicals whose choice is conditioned phonetically or etymologically and exceptional endings. The following is a list of the most frequent irregular verbs:

a avea "to have"
a fi "to be"
a vrea "to want"
a sta "to sit, stand, or remain"
a da "to give"
a azvârli "to throw"
a lua "to take"
a bea "to drink"
a ști "to know"
a usca "to dry"
a continua "to continue"
a mânca "to eat"
a întârzia "to come late"

Notes

References

Bibliography 
 
 
 Maria Iliescu et al., Vocabularul minimal al limbii române, Editura Didactică și Pedagogică, 1981
 Valeria Guțu Romalo et al., Gramatica limbii române, Editura Academiei Române, 2005

External links
 Romanian Reference Grammar with a good section on verbs, by Dana Cojocaru, University of Bucharest (183 pages) – 4.6 MB – pdf
Most common Romanian verbs conjugated also with pronunciation and exercises
Verbix.com: Romanian verbs conjugation (Attention: Generally good output, but a few verbs are not conjugated correctly.)
DEX online: allows you to look up words in a series of prestigious dictionaries of Romanian; contains a conjugator.

Verbs
Indo-European verbs